UAAP Season 73 is the 2010–2011 athletic year of the University Athletic Association of the Philippines. It was hosted by De La Salle University. The men's basketball and the women's volleyball tournaments were aired by ABS-CBN Channel 2 and Studio 23 (the men's basketball events was simulcast over DZRJ-AM) for the eleventh consecutive year following the renewal of the contract for the broadcast of the games. The opening ceremonies were held on July 10, 2010 with the opening game pitting the season host and the UP Fighting Maroons.

Basketball

The UAAP Season 73 basketball tournament began on July 10, 2010 at the Araneta Coliseum in Cubao, Quezon City. The tournament host was De La Salle University and tournament commissioner was Edmundo "Ato" Badolato.

Seniors division

Men's tournament

Elimination round

Playoffs

Awards
 Most Valuable Player: 
 Rookie of the Year:

Women's tournament

Elimination round

Playoffs

Awards
 Most Valuable Player: 
 Rookie of the Year:

Juniors division

Elimination round

Playoffs

Awards
 Most Valuable Player: 
 Rookie of the Year:

Volleyball

Seniors division

Men's tournament

Elimination round

Playoffs

Awards
Most Valuable Player: 
Rookie of the Year:

Women's tournament

Elimination round

Playoffs

Awards
Most Valuable Player: Jacqueline Alarca (De La Salle University)
Rookie of the Year: Ma. Mikaela Esperanza (De La Salle University)

Juniors division

Boys' tournament
With UE sweeping the elimination round, they were declared automatic champions and the playoffs were scrapped.

Elimination round
Host team in boldface.

Awards
Most Valuable Player: 
Rookie of the Year:

Girls' tournament
With De La Salle sweeping the elimination round, they were declared automatic champions and the playoffs were scrapped.

Elimination round
Host team in boldface.

Awards
 Most Valuable Player: 
 Rookie of the Year:

Beach Volleyball

Men's tournament

Elimination round
Host team is boldfaced.

Playoffs

Women's tournament

Elimination round
Host team in boldface.

Playoffs

Football
The UAAP Football will open on January 16, 2011. Games will be played at the Ateneo de Manila University Erenchun and Ocampo Fields.

Men's tournament

Elimination round

Team standings

Match-up results

Finals

UP wins series in one game.

Awards
 Most Valuable Player: 
 Rookie of the Year: 
 Best Striker: 
 Best Midfielder: 
 Best Defender: 
 Best Goalkeeper: 
 Fair Play Award:

Women's tournament

Elimination round

Team standings

Match-up results

Finals
The women's football finals series is a best-of-three series; all matches must have a winner. If a match is tied at the end of full-time, a 30-minute extra time will be played, and if still tied, five rounds of penalty shootout shall be held, and if still tied, a sudden-death penalty shootout shall be held.

FEU wins series 2–1.

Awards
 Most Valuable Player: 
 Rookie of the Year: 
 Best Striker: 
 Best Midfielder: 
 Best Defender: 
 Best Goalkeeper: 
 Fair Play Award:

Baseball
The UAAP Baseball officially opened November 28, 2010. Games were played at the Rizal Memorial Baseball Stadium. With UST sweeping the elimination round, they were declared automatic champions and the playoffs were scrapped.

Men's tournament

Elimination round

Team standings

Host team in boldface.

Match-up results

Softball
The UAAP Softball officially opened December 1, 2010. Games were played at the UP Softball Field. With Adamson sweeping the elimination round, they were declared automatic champions and the playoffs were scrapped.

Women's tournament

Elimination round

Team standings

Host team in boldface.

Match-up results

Badminton

Seniors division

Men's tournament

Elimination round

Team standings
Season host is boldfaced.

Women's tournament

Elimination round

Team standings
Season host is boldfaced.

Judo
The UAAP Judo Championships was held on October 9–10, 2010 at Filoil Flying V Arena in San Juan City. It was a two-day tournament.

Seniors division

Men's tournament
Season host in boldface.

Women's tournament
Season host in boldface.

Juniors division

Boys' tournament
Season host in boldface.

Chess
The UAAP Season 73 chess tournament started on January 8, 2011, Saturday, at the Far Eastern University New Tech Mini Auditorium.

Seniors division

Men's tournament

Season host in boldface.

Awards
 Most Valuable Player:

Women's tournament

Season host in boldface.

Awards
 Most Valuable Player:

Juniors division

Boys' tournament

Season host in boldface.

Awards
 Most Valuable Player:

Swimming
The UAAP Season 73 Swimming Championships started on September 23 at the Trace Aquatics Centre in Los Baños, Laguna. Four titles were disputed in the swimming championships namely: the men's division, the women's division, the boys' division, and the girls' division.

Team ranking is determined by a point system, similar to that of the overall championship. The points given are based on the swimmer's/team's finish in the finals of an event, which include only the top eight finishers from the preliminaries. The gold medalist(s) receive 15 points, silver gets 12, bronze has 10. The following points: 8, 6, 4, 2 and 1 are given to the rest of the participating swimmers/teams according to their order of finish.

Seniors division

Men's tournament

Host team in boldface.

Women's tournament

Host team in boldface.

Juniors division

Boys' tournament

Host team in boldface.

Girls' tournament

Host team in boldface.

Exhibition events

Cheerdance
The UAAP Cheerdance Competition was held on September 12, 2010 at the Araneta Coliseum in Quezon City. The event was covered live by Studio 23 and was hosted by Boom Gonzalez and the various UAAP courtside reporters. Cheer dance competition is an exhibition event. Points for the general championship are not awarded to the participants.

{|class=wikitable style="text-align:center;"
|-
! width=40px|Rank
! width=40px|Order
! Pep squad
! Score
!Percentage
|-
|  || 6th ||align=left|  UP Pep Squad || 440.9
|88.18
|-
|  || 5th ||align=left|  FEU Cheering Squad || 421.4
|84.28
|-
|  || 2nd ||align=left|  UST Salinggawi Dance Troupe || 407.5
|81.50
|-
| 4|| 4th ||align=left|  Ateneo Blue Babble Battalion || 393.2
|78.64
|-
| 5|| 3rd ||align=left|  DLSU Animo Squad || 375.3
|75.06
|-
| 6||1st ||align=left|  UE Pep Squad || 361.0
|72.20
|-
| 7||8th ||align=left|  NU Pep Squad || 357.9
|71.58
|-
| 8||7th ||align=left|  Adamson Pep Squad || 354.6
|70.92
|-
|}Host team in boldface. "Order" refers to order of performance.
Stunner awardee: 

Street dance
The 1st UAAP Street Dance Competition will be held on March 12, 2011 at the Araneta Coliseum in Quezon City. The event will coincide with the awarding ceremony for this season's UAAP. Street dance competition is an exhibition event. Points for the general championship are not awarded to the participants.

Host team in boldface'''. "Order" refers to order of performance.

General championship summary 
The general champion is determined by a point system. The system gives 15 points to the champion team of a UAAP event, 12 to the runner-up, and 10 to the third placer. The following points: 8, 6, 4, 2 and 1 are given to the rest of the participating teams according to their order of finish.

Medals table

Seniors' division

Juniors' division

General championship tally

Seniors' division

Juniors' division

Individual awards
Athlete of the Year:
Seniors: 
Juniors:

See also
NCAA Season 86

References

 
2010 in multi-sport events
73
2010 in Philippine sport